Khushab Junction railway station is  located in  Pakistan.

See also
 List of railway stations in Pakistan
 Pakistan Railways

References

External links

Railway stations in Khushab District
Railway stations on Sangla Hill–Kundian Branch Line
Railway stations on Malakwal–Khushab branch line